Dan Alexandru Leucuță (born 1 October 1987 in Ineu, Romania) is a Romanian football player. He is known for his goalscoring ability.

References

External links

Profile at HLSZ 

1987 births
Living people
People from Ineu
Romanian footballers
Association football forwards
Liga I players
Liga II players
FC Politehnica Iași (1945) players
FC UTA Arad players
CS Național Sebiș players
Békéscsaba 1912 Előre footballers
CS Șoimii Pâncota players
Expatriate footballers in Hungary
Romanian expatriate sportspeople in Hungary